The Singapore Tourism Board (STB) is a statutory board under the Ministry of Trade and Industry of the Government of Singapore, tasked to promote the country's tourism industry.

History

The board was first established on 1 January 1964 and was called the Singapore Tourist Promotion Board (Abbreviation: STPB). In that year, there were 91,000 visitors. The primary task of STPB was to coordinate the efforts of hotels, airlines and travel agents to develop the fledgling tourism industry of the country.

Later, STPB began to initiate new marketing ideas to promote Singapore's image abroad. The board created the Merlion, a symbol based on a Singapore mythical legend, that became an icon of the Singapore destination. The board has also been providing travel agent licensing and tourist guide training.

STPB actively promoted the development of infrastructure, including the building of hotels and tourist attractions such as the Jurong Bird Park and Sentosa which is now a popular resort island for both tourists and local visitors. The board also markets the city as a convention venue and organises events to attract visitors.

In the 1980s, several historic and culturally significant areas such as Chinatown, Little India and Kampong Glam were earmarked for preservation. These places express Singapore's cultural diversity and became popular tourist destinations. The Singapore River underwent a major cleanup program and the areas along the river were developed for restaurants and other tourist amenities.

The board was renamed as Singapore Tourism Board on 19 November 1997.

Past Chairmen
 Mr Chew Choon Seng

Past CEOs
 Lim Neo Chian
 Mr Lionel Yeo

Mission

The board now oversees all aspects of tourism, including resource allocation and long-term strategic planning. It establishes offices around the globe to actively market the Singapore destination.

In the short term, the Singapore government has allocated S$905 million to STB for tourism developments until 2017. A third of this amount will be used to assist the industry to build manpower competencies through education and skills-upgrading initiatives, particularly in key areas such as conference management.

Growth
Singapore tourism industry has grown rapidly since STPB was set up. In 2004, there were 8 million visitors. On 11 January 2005, Minister for Trade and Industry unveiled the Singapore Tourism Board’s (STB) targets to doubling visitor arrivals to 17 million by 2015.

In March 2010, the STB projected a 20-30% increase in visitor arrivals for the year. 2010 would see the much awaited opening of both the Marina Bay Sands and Resorts World Sentosa. This coincided with other key events such as the FORMULA 1 SINGTEL SINGAPORE GRAND PRIX and the inaugural Youth Olympic Games. These offerings were expected to enhance Singapore’s status as a dynamic global city and increase visitor arrivals. The changes in Singapore's landscape would also continue beyond 2010. New developments such as the International Cruise Terminal, Gardens by the Bay and Changi Motor Sports Hub are expected to be unveiled in the coming years.

See also

 Tourism in Singapore
 Passion Made Possible

References

External links

VisitSingapore.com - Official Tourist Guide by STB

Statutory boards of the Singapore Government
Tourism in Singapore
1997 establishments in Singapore
Government agencies established in 1997
Tourism agencies

ta:சிங்கப்பூர் சுற்றுலா வாரியம்